Dolphin shorts or Dolfins are a specific style of unisex shorts worn for athletics. They are typically very short and were originally made from nylon with contrasting binding, side slits, and rounded corners, with a waistband at the top—a style popular in the 1980s.

The name is from Dolfin, the American company that first produced this style of shorts in the 1980s. Due to their shortness, they are sometimes identified as a form of hotpants.

One high-profile wearer of "dolphin shorts" is Richard Simmons, who boasted of owning 400 pairs of vintage Dolfins in 2012.

Orange Dolfin shorts are specified as part of the uniform for waitresses at Hooters restaurants.

See also
 Running shorts

References

Trousers and shorts
1980s fashion